Events in the year 1917 in India.

Incumbents
 Emperor of India – George V
 Viceroy of India – Frederic Thesiger, 1st Viscount Chelmsford

Events
 National income - 20,552 million
 The Indian National Congress demands self-government for India.
 20 August – The secretary of state for India makes the announcement that British policy in India calls for the gradual development of self-governing institutions and the progressive realization of responsible government.
 Champaran Satyagraha

Law
Inland Vessels Act
Post Office Cash Certificates Act
Destruction of Records Act

Births
 17 January – M. G. Ramachandran, Actor, Politician, Former Chief Minister of Tamil Nadu (died 1987).
 11 February – T. Nagi Reddy, communist politician (died 1976).
 11 July 1917 – Chandrakant T. Patel, cotton scientist (died 1990).
 3 September 1917 – G. V. Iyer, film director (died 2003).
 19 November – Indira Gandhi, Prime Minister of India, assassinated (died 1984).
 29 December – Ramanand Sagar, film director (died 2005).

Deaths
 30 June – Dadabhai Naoroji, founder, Indian National Congress and part of the Early Nationalists.

References

 
India
Years of the 20th century in India